Uno Källe (16 June 1931 – 20 July 2009) was an Estonian athletics competitor and coach.

He was born in Karinu Rural Municipality, Järva County. In 1957 he graduated from Moscow Oblast Pedagogical Institute.

In youth he was an active skier. Later he focused on athletics, coached by Harald Rist in Tallinn, and Serafim Paškov in Moscow. He won medals at Estonian championships in different running disciplines. 1952 and 1957 he was a member of Estonian national athletics team.

Since 1953 he worked also as a coach. Besides other posts, he was also a senior coach of Soviet Union women's juniors and women's seniors. Students: Svetlana Ulmasova, Elena Sipatova, Irina Bondarchuk, Jane Salumäe, Maile Mangusson, Rein Valdmaa.

In 1980 he was named as Merited Coach of Soviet Union.

References

1931 births
2009 deaths
Estonian male long-distance runners
Estonian male marathon runners
Estonian sports coaches
People from Järva Parish
Burials at Metsakalmistu